María de los Ángeles López Segovia OAXS MML (20 March 1937 – 19 August 2015), better known as Lina Morgan, was a Spanish film, theater, radio, revue and television actress and vedette. Throughout her career, she stood out for playing mostly comic roles and those related to popular genres such as the Spanish revue and musical comedy. She was also the theater impresario and owner of the Teatro La Latina in Madrid.

Morgan received many accolades throughout her career in film, stage and television spanning near six decades. She was also the recipient of many honors. The Government of Spain honored her with the Gold Medal of Merit in Labour in 1984, the Gold Medal of Merit in the Fine Arts in 1999 and with the Grand Cross of the Civil Order of Alfonso X, the Wise in 2015 posthumously.

Biography
Morgan was born to Emilio López Roldán and Julia García Segovia, and was their fourth child. When she was sixteen, Morgan began working as a showgirl. She received her first major role in 1956 with the movie Mujeres or Diosas, replacing actress Mercedes Llofriu. It was during this time that she adopted her screen name of "Lina Morgan".

She was also the theater impresario of the Teatro La Latina in Madrid from 1978 to 2010, first renting the theater and since 1983 owning it.

Filmography

Film
El pobre García (1961)
Vampiresas 1930 (1962)
Una tal Dulcinea (1963)
Objetivo: las estrellas (1963)
Julieta engaña a Romeo (1965)
La cesta (1965)
Algunas lecciones de amor (1966)
¿Qué hacemos con los hijos? (1967)
Las que tienen que servir (1967)
Los subdesarrollados (1968)
Unmarried and Mother in Life (1969)
 The Complete Idiot (1970)
La graduada (1971)
Dos chicas de revista (1972)
La descarriada (1973) as Nati García
La llamaban La Madrina (1973)
Una monja y un Don Juan (1973)
Señora doctor (1974)
Una pareja... distinta (1974)
Fin de semana al desnudo (1974)
Los pecados de una chica casi decente (1975)
Imposible para una solterona (1976)
Ésta que lo es... (1977)
Un día con Sergio (1977)

Television
Sábado 64 (1965, 1 episode)
Estudio 1 (1966, 1 episode)
Nosotros (1968, 1 episode)
La risa española (1969, 1 episode)
Vaya par de gemelas (1983)
Sí al amor (1986)
El último tranvía (1990)
Fin de año con Lina Morgan (1992)
Celeste... no es un color (1993)
Compuesta y sin novio (1994, 13 episodes)
Hostal Royal Manzanares (1996–1998, 67 episodes)
Una de dos (1998–1999, 19 episodes)
Academia de baile Gloria (2001, 17 episodes)
¿Se puede? (2004, 11 episodes)
El show de la 3 (2005)
Aquí no hay quien viva (2005, 1 episode)
A tortas con la vida (2005–2006, 7 episodes)
Escenas de Matrimonio (2007–2008, 54 episodes)

Accolades

Atv Awards

Premios Ondas

Fotogramas de Plata

TP de Oro

Honours
   Gold Medal of Merit in Labour (Kingdom of Spain, 20 June 1984).
  Gold Medal of Merit in the Fine Arts (Kingdom of Spain, 4 December 1999).
  Dame Grand Cross of the Order of the Second of May (Community of Madrid, 02 May 2010).
  Dame Grand Cross of the Civil Order of Alfonso X, the Wise (Posthumous, Kingdom of Spain, 28 August 2015).

References

External links
 Lina Morgan site
 

1936 births
2015 deaths
Actresses from Madrid
Spanish film actresses
Spanish television actresses
Spanish Roman Catholics
Recipients of the Civil Order of Alfonso X, the Wise
Spanish women comedians